Loch Striven is a sea loch extending off the Firth of Clyde, and forms part of the Cowal peninsula coast, in Argyll and Bute, Scotland.

Terminating at Ardtaraig the hamlet at the head of the loch, where the B836 road provides access to the area.

Hydro-electric generating station
A hydro-electric generating station is located at the head of Loch Striven at Ardtaraig, supplied with water through large pipes from water captured at Loch Tarsan, known as the Striven Hydro-Electric Scheme (also known as the Cowal Hydro-Electric Power Scheme). The building was designed to blend-in with the local architecture and appears to resemble a large house or small church when viewed from a distance Opened in 1951, its single turbine has a generating capacity of 8MW.

Laid up ships

During times of recession in shipping, the sea loch has been used as a sheltered anchorage for laid-up vessels. The (then) newly built LNG carriers MV Gastor and her sister ship MV Nestor were laid up here from delivery from the shipyard Chantiers de l'Atlantique in 1976 until being sold 15 years later to Bonny Gas Transport in 1992. The Danish shipping company Maersk used the sea loch for cold layup of some of its vessels (namely four of the B- class vessels in its fleet and Sealand Performance) from 2009 to 2010.

World War II

The upper reaches of the sea loch, because of their secluded location, and their topographical similarity to Norwegian fjords, were used extensively for midget submarine (X-craft) training during World War II. The training programme was directed from HMS Varbel in Port Bannatyne to the south in the luxury Kyles Hydro Hotel, overlooking the port, which was requisitioned by the Admiralty to serve as the HQ for midget submarine operations, including the attack on the Tirpitz.  Ardtaraig House, located at the head of Loch Striven, and similarly requisitioned by the Admiralty, became a secondary naval base for the 12th Submarine Flotilla midget submarines and became known as HMS Varbel II.

The loch was also used as the main trials area for "Highball" (see picture), the smaller anti-ship version of "Upkeep", the "bouncing bomb" used by The Dambusters. Over 100 dummy bombs were dropped in the loch between Spring 1943 and Autumn 1944, using (at first) a Wellington but mainly Mosquitoes based at RAF Turnberry. Two of these bombs were recovered in 2017; one is now at Brooklands Museum and the other at the de Havilland Aircraft Museum. Between 15 and 17 May 1944, HMS Malaya was used in Loch Striven as a target ship for inert Highball bouncing bomb prototypes, one of which punched a hole in the ship's side.

References

External links

Striven
Striven
Firth of Clyde
Cowal